Colonel Edward Denny (10 February 1652 – 1712) was an Anglo-Irish politician. 

Denny was born at Tralee Castle, the son of Sir Arthur Denny and Ellen Barry. In 1674 he married Mary Boyle Maynard, with whom he had sixteen children. He rebuilt the family seat at Tralee Castle in 1691 after it had been destroyed during the Williamite War in Ireland. He was the Member of Parliament for Kerry in the Irish House of Commons between 1692 and 1699.

References

1652 births
1712 deaths
17th-century Anglo-Irish people
18th-century Anglo-Irish people
Irish MPs 1692–1693
Irish MPs 1695–1699
Members of the Parliament of Ireland (pre-1801) for County Kerry constituencies
Williamite military personnel of the Williamite War in Ireland